Gravesend is a town in Kent, England.

Gravesend may also refer to:

Places 
Gravesend, New South Wales, Australia
Gravesend, Hertfordshire, England, a hamlet
Gravesend, Brooklyn, a neighbourhood of New York City, United States

Other uses
Gravesend (film), a 1997 criminal drama film
 "Gravesend", a song by Stone Sour from House of Gold & Bones – Part 2